James Joseph Nealon (December 15, 1884 – April 2, 1910) was a professional baseball player. He was born in San Francisco, and died in San Francisco, at the age of 25.

He was a first baseman over parts of 2 seasons (1906–1907) with the Pittsburgh Pirates. In his rookie season in 1906, he tied for the National League lead in RBIs with 83 with Harry Steinfeldt. The next year, he contracted tuberculosis, ending his baseball career. He subsequently died of typhoid pneumonia at the age of 25.

In 259 games over two seasons, Nealon posted a .256 batting average (240-for-937) with 111 runs, 31 doubles, 20 triples, 3 home runs, 130 RBI, 26 stolen bases and 76 bases on balls. Defensively, he recorded a .983 fielding percentage as a first baseman.

See also
 List of Major League Baseball annual runs batted in leaders

References

External links

1884 births
1910 deaths
Major League Baseball first basemen
Baseball players from San Francisco
Pittsburgh Pirates players
National League RBI champions
Oakland Reliance players
San Francisco (minor league baseball) players
San Jose (minor league baseball) players
Sacramento Senators players
Oakland Commuters players
Deaths from typhoid fever
Deaths from pneumonia in California